The arrondissement of Les Andelys is an arrondissement of France in the Eure department in the Normandy region. It has 185 communes.

Composition

The communes of the arrondissement of Les Andelys are:

Acquigny
Aigleville
Ailly
Alizay
Amécourt
Amfreville-les-Champs
Amfreville-sous-les-Monts
Amfreville-sur-Iton
Andé
Les Andelys
Autheuil-Authouillet
Authevernes
Bacqueville
Bazincourt-sur-Epte
Beauficel-en-Lyons
Bernouville
Bézu-la-Forêt
Bézu-Saint-Éloi
Bois-Jérôme-Saint-Ouen
Boisset-les-Prévanches
La Boissière
Bosquentin
Bouafles
Bouchevilliers
Bourg-Beaudouin
Breuilpont
Bueil
Caillouet-Orgeville
Cailly-sur-Eure
Chaignes
Chambray
Champenard
La Chapelle-Longueville
Charleval
Château-sur-Epte
Chauvincourt-Provemont
Clef-Vallée-d'Eure
Connelles
Le Cormier
Coudray
Courcelles-sur-Seine
Crasville
Criquebeuf-sur-Seine
Croisy-sur-Eure
Cuverville
Les Damps
Dangu
Daubeuf-près-Vatteville
Douains
Doudeauville-en-Vexin
Douville-sur-Andelle
Écouis
Étrépagny
Fains
Farceaux
Fleury-la-Forêt
Fleury-sur-Andelle
Flipou
Fontaine-Bellenger
Fontaine-sous-Jouy
Frenelles-en-Vexin
Gadencourt
Gaillon
Gamaches-en-Vexin
Gasny
Gisors
Giverny
Guerny
Guiseniers
Hacqueville
Hardencourt-Cocherel
Harquency
La Haye-le-Comte
La Haye-Malherbe
Hébécourt
Hécourt
Hennezis
Herqueville
Heubécourt-Haricourt
Heudebouville
Heudicourt
Heudreville-sur-Eure
La Heunière
Heuqueville
Les Hogues
Houlbec-Cocherel
Houville-en-Vexin
Igoville
Incarville
Jouy-sur-Eure
Léry
Letteguives
Lilly
Lisors
Longchamps
Lorleau
Louviers
Lyons-la-Forêt
Mainneville
Le Manoir
Martagny
Martot
Ménesqueville
Ménilles
Mercey
Merey
Le Mesnil-Jourdain
Mesnil-sous-Vienne
Mesnil-Verclives
Mézières-en-Vexin
Morgny
Mouflaines
Muids
Neaufles-Saint-Martin
Neuilly
La Neuve-Grange
Nojeon-en-Vexin
Notre-Dame-de-l'Isle
Noyers
Pacy-sur-Eure
Perriers-sur-Andelle
Perruel
Pinterville
Pîtres
Le Plessis-Hébert
Pont-de-l'Arche
Pont-Saint-Pierre
Porte-de-Seine
Port-Mort
Poses
Pressagny-l'Orgueilleux
Puchay
Quatremare
Radepont
Renneville
Richeville
Romilly-sur-Andelle
La Roquette
Rosay-sur-Lieure
Rouvray
Saint-Aubin-sur-Gaillon
Saint-Denis-le-Ferment
Sainte-Colombe-près-Vernon
Sainte-Geneviève-lès-Gasny
Sainte-Marie-de-Vatimesnil
Saint-Étienne-du-Vauvray
Saint-Étienne-sous-Bailleul
Saint-Julien-de-la-Liègue
Saint-Marcel
Saint-Pierre-de-Bailleul
Saint-Pierre-du-Vauvray
Saint-Pierre-la-Garenne
Saint-Vincent-des-Bois
Sancourt
Saussay-la-Campagne
Surtauville
Surville
Suzay
Terres de Bord
Le Thil
Les Thilliers-en-Vexin
Le Thuit
Tilly
Touffreville
Les Trois Lacs
Le Tronquay
La Vacherie
Val-de-Reuil
Le Val-d'Hazey
Val d'Orger
Vandrimare
Vascœuil
Vatteville
Le Vaudreuil
Vaux-sur-Eure
Vernon
Vesly
Vexin-sur-Epte
Vézillon
Villegats
Villers-en-Vexin
Villers-sur-le-Roule
Villez-sous-Bailleul
Villiers-en-Désœuvre
Vironvay

History

The arrondissement of Les Andelys was created in 1800. It was expanded in 2006 with the two cantons of Louviers-Nord and Louviers-Sud from the arrondissement of Évreux. At the January 2017 reorganisation of the arrondissements of Eure, it gained 35 communes from the arrondissement of Évreux, and it lost one commune to the arrondissement of Bernay.

As a result of the reorganisation of the cantons of France which came into effect in 2015, the borders of the cantons are no longer related to the borders of the arrondissements. The cantons of the arrondissement of Les Andelys were, as of January 2015:

 Les Andelys
 Écos
 Étrépagny
 Fleury-sur-Andelle
 Gaillon
 Gaillon-Campagne
 Gisors
 Louviers-Nord
 Louviers-Sud
 Lyons-la-Forêt
 Pont-de-l'Arche
 Val-de-Reuil

References

Les Andelys